Alto del Buitre is a mountain of the Sierra Palomera range, Valencian Community, Spain. There is a triangulation station at the top marked "5195".

It is located within the Ayora municipal term, rising 15 km SE of the town. The summit offers a good view of the surrounding landscape and is popular with hikers. 

There were fierce combats in the area of the Alto del Buitre in 1938 during the Levante Offensive of the Spanish Civil War.

There are mountains named "Alto del Buitre" in Colombia and in Chile as well. The name means "High Place of the Vulture" in Spanish.

See also
Mountains of the Valencian Community

References

External links 
 Mapa de Alto del Buitre en 46620 Ayora, Valencia, España

Valle de Cofrentes
Mountains of the Valencian Community